is a Japanese actress and fashion model. She is represented with Ever Green Entertainment.

Okamoto won the Grand Prix in the audition for the magazine Love Berry in 2011, became an exclusive model later on until 2012, and later became an exclusive model for the magazine Nicola. She is now an exclusive model for Seventeen.

One of Okamoto's prominent activities is when she appeared as an Oha Girl in the television programme Oha Suta from 2012 to 2013. In contrast to her modelling activities, she appear in television dramas such as Yakō Kanran-sha, GTO and Hell Teacher Nūbē since 2013, and gained particular attention when she appeared in GTO in 2014, in which it dramatically increased her recognition as an actress.

Filmography

TV drama

TV programmes

Films

Stage

Advertising

Advertisements

Bibliography

Magazines

Mook

References

External links
 
Official profile 

Japanese female models
21st-century Japanese actresses
People from Kanagawa Prefecture
1998 births
Living people